"Floy Joy" is a song written by Smokey Robinson and released as a single in December 1971 by popular Motown female singing group The Supremes.

The song, built on a retro sixties vibe reminiscent of past Supremes songs, was recorded by the group's former mentor Robinson, marking his first production of a Supremes song since 1969's "The Composer".

The song featured original Supreme Mary Wilson and early-seventies Supremes lead singer Jean Terrell on lead vocals, featuring the third lead vocals by Wilson on a Supremes hit single.

The song peaked at number five on the Billboard Hot R&B/Hip-Hop Songs charts, number sixteen on the American pop singles chart and number nine on the UK Singles Chart.

Personnel
Lead vocals by Mary Wilson and Jean Terrell
Background vocals by Mary Wilson, Jean Terrell, Cindy Birdsong
Additional vocals by The Andantes
Instrumentation by The Funk Brothers and Marv Tarplin of The Miracles
Produced and written by William "Smokey" Robinson

Critical reception
Cashbox published, 'Smoky wrote this one for the girls and it's much in the tradition of "Baby Love." Basic footstomper could go all the way for them, pop and soul.'

Charts

Weekly charts

Year-end charts

Certifications

References

1971 songs
1972 singles
The Supremes songs
Songs written by Smokey Robinson
Song recordings produced by Smokey Robinson
Motown singles